Royco Fuata Flava is a Kenyan reality cooking competition show produced by Unilever. It hosted by renowned chef Benjamin Nyaga, Benta Ochieng and Kobi Kihara. It engages a range of professional and aspiring cooks that audition per region in Kenya. Royco, a spice popular in Kenyan households is the mandatory ingredient for every weekly challenge. The show was renewed for its second season in September 2015 on NTV.

Unsourced

Judges 
 Benjamin Nyaga
 Benta Ochieng
 Kobi Kihara

Seasons

Season one
The first season debuted on October 5, 2014, ran for 13 episodes and it had 32 contestants short-listed out of the thousands of other Kenyans picked all over the latter country. Two eliminations were made were made per week depending on the satisfactory status of their meals prepared. From 32 down to 2 contestants, Amanda Gicharu and Tirus Thini. On the season's finale, the finalists were asked to pick ingredients  prepared and covered by the judges from the Royce Flava Store in random but to their surprise, they were later instructed to exchange cooking points and thereby adding an ingredient that would give the other counterpart hell of time during his/her cooking. Amanda Gicharu was named the winner for impressing the judges. Tirus was awarded ksh 200K for being the runners-up. The season's finale was broadcast on December 7, 2015.

Season one contestants

Season two
The second season incepted on October 3, 2015 with 12 contestants. Kobi Kihara joined chef Ben Nyaga as one of the judges.

Season two contestants

Finalists

Broadcasting
The first season was broadcast in Citizen TV. Episodes were 30 minutes long. It occupied the 5:30pm timeslot on Sundays and ran for 13 episodes.
The second season kicked off on September 25, 2015 on NTV. It occupied the 7:30 pm timeslot with 45 minutes-long episodes with 12 contestants.

References

External links

Kenyan television series
2014 Kenyan television series debuts
English-language television shows
2010s Kenyan television series
NTV (Kenyan TV channel) original programming